Michelle Latiolais (born 1956) is an American author and academic known for the novels She, A Proper Knowledge, and Even Now, which received the Gold Medal for Fiction from the Commonwealth Club of California. She is a professor of English at the University of California, Irvine, where she co-directs the Programs in Writing.

Background 
Latiolais was born in Denver, Colorado, in 1956. She received a Master in Fine Arts in fiction and poetry from the University of California, Irvine and a Master of Arts from the University of Denver, where she was taught by novelist John Edward Williams. She later wrote the introduction to the New York Review Books Classic edition of Williams' novel Butcher's Crossing.

She lives in Los Angeles.

Bibliography
Even Now (1990)
A Proper Knowledge (2008)
Widow (2011)
She (2016)

References

1956 births
Living people
21st-century American novelists
University of California, Irvine faculty
21st-century American short story writers